Church of St Andrew and St Columba (or Scots' Kirk) is a church with two separate buildings located in Kala Ghoda (St Andrew) and Fort (St Columba) in Mumbai, India. It was Bombay's first Scottish church and was built in 1819 after the arrival of the city's first Presbyterian minister, James Clow, who was appointed chaplain for the East India Company in 1815. The two Scottish churches were merged in 1938. 

The architectural style of St Andrew is Greek revival and the facade is said to have been inspired by St Martin-in-the-Fields in London. Both St Andrew and St Columba are only open on Sundays for service, and on other days the latter is used for the church's homeless street children project.

References

(1869). "Presbyterianism in Victoria and Otago and Southland." The Reformed Presbyterian magazine. 1 July.

Churches in Mumbai
Church of North India church buildings
1819 establishments in India
Religious buildings and structures completed in 1819
Greek Revival church buildings
Neoclassical church buildings in India